The Dolly Gray impostor was an unknown American football player who played under the alias of Jack "Dolly" Gray, an end from Princeton University in 1922. He was rumored to be an All-American honoree in 1922; however, the only known player named Gray to be awarded consensus All-American honors at Princeton in 1922 was Howdy Gray, who was also an end. Under the alias of Gray, the impostor played in the National Football League in 1923 for the St. Louis All-Stars and the Green Bay Packers.

In 1923, the impostor approached Ollie Kraehe, the owner and player-coach of the NFL's St. Louis All-Stars. Kraehe signed him to the All-Stars where the impostor played in three games. After witnessing the poor quality of play in what he thought was Dolly Gray, an All-American football star at Princeton, Kraehe discovered that he was lied to and that the man claiming to be Dolly Gray was actually an impostor.

Kraehe decided to pull the deception that had been pulled on him on another team. After a 6–0 loss to the Cleveland Indians, Kraehe released the impostor to Curly Lambeau and the Green Bay Packers in exchange for cash he desperately needed to keep his team operating. From Lambeau's perspective, it appeared that he had gained the best player on the All-Stars roster. Two weeks later, the Packers played the All-Stars at Sportsman's Park. The game ended in a 3–0 Packers victory. After the game, Curly Lambeau cornered the St. Louis owner and questioned him about Dolly Gray. According to Lambeau, Gray played in just one game with the Packers and had played poorly. Then, after boarding the train for the team's game in St. Louis, he had mysteriously disappeared.  Kraehe then admitted to Lambeau that the deal between the two clubs regarding Gray was a joke. He explained how the con man had deceived his way onto the All-Stars roster. Kraehe then thought that he would try to recycle the trick on Lambeau in good fun. Kraehe finally stated that it had always been his intention to give Lambeau back the money he spent on the impostor. The person's identity remains unknown.

See also
Randy Johnson (offensive lineman), a later pro football player who was the target of an impostor

References

St. Louis All-Stars players
Green Bay Packers players
National Football League controversies
Unidentified people